Edmund Mackenzie "Edmond" Young (1838 – 23 April 1897) was an Australian banker, financier/investor and grazier. Young was born in Coleraine, County Londonderry, Ireland and died in Sydney, New South Wales.

See also

 William Spence
 George Dibbs
 James MacBain

References

Australian bankers
Australian farmers
Australian Anglicans
Australian people of Irish descent
1838 births
1897 deaths
19th-century Australian businesspeople